Time Out ( or 'Le Vendu') is a 2001 French drama film directed by Laurent Cantet and starring Aurélien Recoing and Karin Viard. The film is loosely based on the life story of Jean-Claude Romand (though without the criminal element), and it focuses on one of Cantet's favorite subjects: a man's relationship with his job.

The film received considerable attention internationally and was shown at the Venice Film Festival and Toronto International Film Festival. It was one of the independent films to be featured at the New York Film Festival.

Plot
The film tells the story of Vincent, a middle-aged man who is fired after having spent more than 11 years working for a prestigious consulting firm. Unable to admit to his family that he has been fired, the unemployed former executive continues to pretend he is going to the office every day. In reality, Vincent spends his time aimlessly driving the highways of France and Switzerland, reading newspapers, or sleeping in his car.

As time progresses, Vincent invents more and more elaborate lies, throwing himself into a vicious spiral of deceit. To sustain his bourgeois lifestyle, Vincent sets up a Ponzi scheme and is eventually enlisted into smuggling by career thief Jean-Michel. Murielle, Vincent's wife, after discovering her husband's "life of lies" attempts to bring him back into the realm of reality.

Cast 
 Aurélien Recoing as Vincent
 Karin Viard as Muriel
 Serge Livrozet as Jean-Michel
 Jean-Pierre Mangeot as Father
 Monique Mangeot as Mother
 Didier Perez as Philippe
 Philippe Jouannet as Human Resources Director

Reception 
Time Out received generally positive reviews from critics. Review aggregation website Rotten Tomatoes reported an approval rating of 96%, based on 82 reviews, with an average rating of 8/10. The consensus reads, "A haunting psychological drama, Time Out takes a penetrating look at the angst of the modern worker." At Metacritic, which assigns a normalized rating out of 100 to reviews from mainstream critics, the film received an average score of 88, based on 30 reviews, indicating "universal acclaim".

The film was placed at 99 on Slant Magazines best films of the 2000s, number 9 of The Guardian's best films of the noughties, and number 11 at The A.V. Clubs top 50 films of the 2000s.

Accolades

References

External links 
 
 
 
 
 

2001 drama films
2001 films
Films directed by Laurent Cantet
Films scored by Jocelyn Pook
French drama films
2000s French-language films
2000s French films